John Pascarella (born 1966) is an American soccer coach who is currently on the staff of Forward Madison FC in USL League One.

Playing career
Raised in Vineland, New Jersey, Pascarella played prep soccer at Vineland High School together with Glenn Carbonara, with both graduating in 1984.

Pascarella played four years of college soccer at Pennsylvania State University between 1984 and 1987, before playing professional soccer. He had stints abroad with Russian Stars and in Peru with both Sport Boys and Alianza Atlético, before returning to the United States. In the US, Pascarella played in the A-League and USISL Premier League with Richmond Kickers and Standard Falcons, before joining MLS side Los Angeles Galaxy in 1996.

Management career
Pascarella's coaching career began at the University of Maryland in 1998. He later was head coach at Herndon High School, the U.S. Olympic Development Program in Virginia and with USL PDL side Northern Virginia Royals. He joined Peter Vermes at Kansas City Wizards in MLS as goalkeeping coach in 2009, before becoming an assistant coach.

In 2017, he was named head coach at PDL side Des Moines Menace, getting the team to the Conference Finals.

On December 21, 2017, Pascarella was appointed goalkeeping coach with Minnesota United ahead of their inaugural season in MLS.

On November 22, 2019, Pascarella was named head coach of USL Championship side OKC Energy, his first fully professional head coaching position.

On June 4, 2021, following a winless start to the 2021 USL Championship season, Pascarella and the OKC Energy mutually agreed to part ways.

Pascarella joined Forward Madison FC's staff on January 7, 2022.

References

1966 births
Living people
Association football goalkeepers
American soccer coaches
OKC Energy FC coaches
Soccer players from New Jersey
Penn State Nittany Lions men's soccer players
People from Vineland, New Jersey
Sport Boys footballers
Sportspeople from Cumberland County, New Jersey
Alianza Atlético footballers
Richmond Kickers players
LA Galaxy players
American soccer players
American expatriate soccer players
American expatriate sportspeople in Peru
American expatriate sportspeople in Russia
Vineland High School alumni
A-League Men players
USL Championship coaches
Expatriate footballers in Peru
Expatriate footballers in Russia
Maryland Terrapins men's soccer coaches
High school soccer coaches in the United States
USL League Two coaches
Sporting Kansas City non-playing staff
Minnesota United FC non-playing staff
Forward Madison FC coaches